Nathaniel Bezaleel Early (July 30, 1866 – August 15, 1947) was an American Democratic politician who served as a member of the Virginia Senate from 1908 to 1934.

References

External links
Nathaniel Beazaleel Early entry at The Political Graveyard

1866 births
1947 deaths
Democratic Party members of the Virginia House of Delegates
People from Albemarle County, Virginia
Virginia Military Institute alumni
Democratic Party Virginia state senators
University of Virginia School of Law alumni